64th Regiment or 64th Infantry Regiment may refer to:

 Loudon's Highlanders, a unit of the British Army raised in 1745 and ranked as 64th Foot 
 64th (2nd Staffordshire) Regiment of Foot, a unit of the British Army 
 64th (Liverpool Irish) Lancashire Rifle Volunteer Corps, a unit of the British Territorial Army
 64th (Queen's Own Royal Glasgow Yeomanry) Anti-Tank Regiment, Royal Artillery, British Yeomanry unit
 64th Armor Regiment, a unit of the US Army
 64th Infantry Regiment (United States), a unit of the US Army

American Civil War
Union (Northern) Army
 64th Illinois Volunteer Infantry Regiment  
 64th New York Volunteer Infantry Regiment
 64th Ohio Infantry
 64th United States Colored Infantry Regiment

Confederate (Southern) Army
 64th Virginia Mounted Infantry

See also
 64th Division (disambiguation)
 64th Squadron (disambiguation)